Markus Smarzoch (born 14 April 1990) is a German footballer who currently plays for ASV Burglengenfeld.

Smarzoch made his professional debut for SSV Jahn Regensburg during the 2011–12 3. Liga season away to Kickers Offenbach.

References

External links 
 

1990 births
Living people
German footballers
Association football forwards
2. Bundesliga players
3. Liga players
SSV Jahn Regensburg players
Chattanooga FC players
SSV Jahn Regensburg II players
People from Freising
Sportspeople from Upper Bavaria
Footballers from Bavaria